Tarsometatarsal ligaments may refer to:

 Dorsal tarsometatarsal ligaments
 Plantar tarsometatarsal ligaments